The genus Chaetosa are small to medium-sized predatory flies.

Species
C. churchilli Malloch, 1931
C. punctipes (Meigen, 1826)

References

Scathophagidae
Schizophora genera
Taxa named by Daniel William Coquillett